Camillo Almici (2 November 1714 – 30 December 1779) was a priest of the Congregation of the Oratory, of distinguished theological attainments.

Biography
Almici was born at Brescia, of a noble family. He became a member of the Congregation of the Oratory at a very early age, and devoted himself to the study of theology, Greek, and Hebrew, the Bible, chronology, sacred and profane history, antiquities, criticism, diplomacy, and liturgy, and was held in much esteem for his great and wide learning. Amongst his contemporaries, he was regarded as an oracle upon many subjects, and is looked upon as one of the most celebrated theologians of his order.

He has left critical reflections on the work of Febronius's De Statu Ecclesiae (1763), together with some treatises, part of which are still in manuscript. His Méditations sur la vie et les écrits du P. Sarpi is a critical examination of Paolo Sarpi's partisan history of the Council of Trent.

He wrote under multiple pseudonyms, including Callimaco Limi, Callimaco Mili, and N. N.

His brother Giambattista Almici was a celebrated Italian jurist.

Works

Of the many works he wrote, the principal are the following:

 Riflessioni sù di un libro di G. Febronio (1766)
 Critica contro le opere del pericoloso Voltaire (1770)
 Dissertazione spora i Martiri della Chiesa cattolica (1765, 2 vols.)
 Méditations sur la vie et les écrits du P. Sarpi (1765)

References

1714 births
1779 deaths
Religious leaders from Brescia
18th-century Italian Roman Catholic priests
Italian literary critics
Italian male writers
Italian biblical scholars
18th-century Italian historians
18th-century Italian Roman Catholic theologians
Oratorians